William P. Connery Sr. (September 1855 – November 1928) was a Massachusetts politician who served as the 34th mayor of Lynn, Massachusetts.  He was the father of U.S. Congressional Representatives Lawrence J. Connery and William P. Connery, Jr.

References

Notes
 

1855 births
1928 deaths
Mayors of Lynn, Massachusetts